Lee Man-hee (born 15 September 1931) is a Korean religious leader. Lee is a peace activist and the founder of the Shincheonji Church of Jesus, a South Korean Christian group that is often described as a cult. Lee is a self-proclaimed messiah, whose followers believe he is immortal and infallible.

Early life 

Lee was born on 15 September 1931 in Punggak-myeon, Cheongdo County, North Gyeongsang Province(Keishōhoku-dō), Japanese Korea.

During the Korean War, Lee served in the 7th Infantry Division of the Republic of Korea Army; after the war he returned to Punggak Village and worked as a farmer.

COVID-19 outbreak 

On 22 February 2020, South Korea confirmed that 231 of their 433 cases of COVID-19 were from within the Shincheonji sect. Lee called the coronavirus a "devil's deed" intended to stop the sect's growth, but he canceled all gatherings of his faith. The Korea Centers for Disease Control and Prevention said the practice of gathering followers in close quarters for religious services may have contributed to the fast spread of the disease.

On 1 March 2020, Seoul mayor Park Won-soon announced that the Seoul Metropolitan Government had made a criminal complaint about Lee, asking for an investigation into him and twelve others connected to the sect on charges of murder and violations of the Disease Control Act, citing their negligence in preventing an outbreak among their parishioners and their refusal to cooperate with the government throughout the crisis.

On 31 July 2020, Lee was arrested by South Korean authorities for allegedly violating the Infectious Disease and Control Act. At issue was a dispute over withholding data from the government for contact tracing, with the church asserting privacy. Lee was also charged with embezzlement and other crimes. By this time, the Shincheonji Church was being linked to more than 5,200 coronavirus infections, or 36% of South Korea’s total cases. On 13 January 2021 Suwon District Court in Seoul acquitted Lee of violating the infectious disease laws. However Lee was convicted of embezzling 5.6 billion won ($4.7m USD) and obstruction of public affairs. Lee was sentenced to three years in prison. He remains out of jail on probation for four years.

References 

1931 births
Living people
South Korean religious leaders
Founders of new religious movements
People from North Gyeongsang Province
Self-declared messiahs